This article is a gallery of the flags of the principal subdivisions of the countries and territories of Oceania.  For purposes of this article, Oceania is taken to comprise Australasia, Melanesia, Micronesia and Polynesia.

The principal subdivisions are generally the ones that are identified as first-order subdivisions under the ISO 3166-2 coding scheme.  If a country has no such first-order subdivisions, but has second-order subdivisions that have their own official flags, then the flags of those second-order subdivisions are given here.

This gallery includes only current official flags.  For historical or non-official flags of any particular country or territory (if any), see the main article for that country or territory.

Unless indicated otherwise, information on each country has been taken from the World Factbook, as updated through July 11, 2016 (for which see the External Links section, below).

Australasia

Australia

Australia comprises six states and two territories, as well as several dependant islands located in the Indian and Pacific oceans.

The official flag for each of the six states consists of the Australian national flag, but with the stars removed and replaced with the state's coat of arms.

Most of the dependent areas (sometimes called the "external territories") have no official flag of their own and instead use the Australian national flag.  Three external territories do have their own official flags–Christmas Island, Cocos (Keeling) Islands, and Norfolk Island.

States

Territories

Dependent areas

New Zealand

New Zealand has sixteen first-level administrative subdivisions.  Eleven of them are governed by regional authorities; the other five are governed by unitary authorities (which combine the roles of regional and territorial governance).  The Chatham Islands lie outside any of the sixteen regions, but collectively possess some of the governing authority of a region.  Most of these seventeen authorities have not adopted official flags.

The Realm of New Zealand includes two non-self-governing territories, one of which (Tokelau) has its own official flag.  The other, the Ross Dependency, does not.  It also includes the two island nations that are in free association with New Zealand–the Cook Islands and Niue.  Their official flags are shown here.

Regions

Non-self-governing territories

Nations in free association with New Zealand

Melanesia

Fiji

Fiji is subdivided into fourteen provinces, which are loosely aggregated into four "divisions".  There is also a self-governing dependency, Rotuma.  None of these administrative units has adopted an official flag.

French collectivities in Melanesia

One of France's overseas regions is located in Melanesia.  This region is New Caledonia, which is a special-status collectivity of France.  It has a flag that shares its official status with that of the French tricolor.

New Caledonia

New Caledonia is a special-status collectivity of France, divided administratively into three provinces.  Each has its own official flag.

Indonesia

The administration of Indonesia is divided amongst 34 provinces, four of which are located in Melanesia (the others are located in Southeast Asia).  The four Melanesian provinces are Maluku, North Maluku, Papua and West Papua.  It is unclear whether any of these provinces has adopted an official flag.

Papua New Guinea

Papua New Guinea is divided into twenty provinces plus a national capital district (i.e., Port Moresby) and Bougainville, an autonomous region.  Each has its own official flag.

Provinces

Districts and autonomous regions

Vanuatu

Vanuatu is divided administratively into six provinces.  Each province has its own official flag.

Micronesia

Federated States of Micronesia

The Federated States of Micronesia is a federal republic that has entered into a compact of free association with the United States.  It has four states, each of which has its own official flag.

Guam
Guam is a self-governing territory of the United States.  It has no first-order administrative divisions.

Kiribati

Although Kiribati is split geographically into three areas (the Gilbert Islands, the Line Islands and the Phoenix Islands), these geographic divisions are not used for administration.  Administrative units exist at the district and island levels, but none are first-order administrative subdivisions.

Marshall Islands
The Marshall Islands is a federal republic that has entered into a compact of free association with the United States.  There are no first-order administrative subdivisions.

Nauru

Nauru is divided into fourteen administrative districts, none of which has an official flag.

Northern Mariana Islands
The Northern Mariana Islands are a self-governing territory of the United States.  There are no first-order administrative subdivisions.

Palau

Palau is a republic that has entered into a compact of free association with the United States.  It is composed of sixteen states, each of which has its own official flag.

United States in Micronesia

The United States has three territories in Micronesia.  Two of them (Guam and the Northern Mariana Islands) are self-governing and have their own official flags.  The third (Wake Island) is not self-governing and uses the flag of the United States as its official flag.

Three Micronesian nations have entered into a compact of free association with the United States.  These are the Federated States of Micronesia, the Marshall Islands and Palau.

Territories

Micronesian nations in free association with the United States

Wake Island
Wake Island is a territory of the United States.  It has no first-order administrative subdivisions.

Polynesia

American Samoa
American Samoa is a territory of the United States.  It has no first-order administrative subdivisions.

Chilean territory in Polynesia
Chile has one territory in Polynesia, Isla de Pascua (also known as Easter Island).  However, it is administered as a province in the country's Valparaiso region, and not as a first-order subdivision of Chile.

Cook Islands
The Cook Islands are a nation that is in free association with New Zealand.  It has no first-order administrative subdivisions.

French collectivities in Polynesia

There are two French collectivities in Polynesia—French Polynesia and Wallis and Futuna.  French Polynesia has a flag that shares its official status with that of the French tricolor; Wallis and Futuna does not.  Also, Clipperton Island is a French territory in Polynesia, but not a collectivity.  It is uninhabited and does not have its own official flag.

French Polynesia

French Polynesia is an overseas collectivity of France.  It consists of six archipelagos: the Austral Islands, the Gambier Islands, the Marquesas Islands, the Tuāmotu Islands, plus the Leeward Islands and the Windward Islands (the last two collectively formerly known as the Society Islands).  Although French Polynesia has no first-order administrative subdivisions within the meaning of the ISO 3166-2 coding scheme, there are five second-order subdivisions that correspond to each of the archipelagos, except that the Gambier and Tuāmotu Islands are combined into a single administrative division.  None of these divisions has adopted an official flag.  However, a 1985 territorial decree permits the official use, alongside the French tricolour and the French Polynesian flag, of the official flag of the archipelago on which the flags are displayed.  Four of the archipelagos have adopted such official flags.  The two that have not are the Leeward Islands and the Windward Islands.

Niue
Niue is a nation that is in free association with New Zealand.  It has no first-order administrative subdivisions.

Pitcairn Islands
The Pitcairn Islands are a territory of the United Kingdom.  There are no administrative subdivisions.

Samoa

Samoa is divided administratively into eleven districts.  None of them have adopted an official flag.

Tokelau
Tokelau is a self-administering territory of New Zealand.  It has no administrative subdivisions.

Tonga

Tonga is a constitutional monarchy composed of five administrative divisions.  None of them have adopted official flags.

Tuvalu

Tuvalu is a nation administered by seven island councils, plus one town council (Funafuti).  None of these councils has adopted an official flag.

United Kingdom in Polynesia
The Pitcairn Islands are the only British overseas territory in Oceania.  It has an official flag.

United States in Polynesia

Hawaii, one of the fifty United States, is located in Polynesia, as is one of the territories of the United States (American Samoa).

Seven of the nine islands in the United States Minor Outlying Islands group are located in Polynesia.  These are Baker Island, Howland Island, Jarvis Island, Johnston Atoll, Kingman Reef, Midway Atoll and Palmyra Atoll.  None have a permanent population and all use the flag of the United States as their official flags.

States and territories

Wallis and Futuna

Wallis and Futuna is a collectivity of France.  It is composed of three precincts—Alo, Sigave and Uvea—each corresponding to a traditional kingdom.

See also
Flags of Oceania (a gallery of national-level flags)

General references
World Factbook - Administrative divisions (administrative divisions for all the world's countries, in a single list)
Flags of the World (clickable map of Oceania)

References

External links
Administrative subdivisions
World Factbook (select the country from the search box)
ISO Online Browsing Platform (type in name of country in search box or select from list)
Flags
Vexilla Mundi (site map; look for country links labeled 'divisions')

Oceania
Oceania